The Washington Avenue Armory, officially known as the Washington Avenue Armory Sports and Convention Arena and listed on the National Register of Historic Places as Washington Avenue (Tenth Battalion) Armory, is now a multi-purpose arena on the corner of Washington Avenue and Lark Street in downtown Albany, New York.  The Armory has a capacity of 4,300 for concerts and conventions and 3,600 for sports events.

History
The Armory was built in 1890 for the Tenth Battalion of the New York National Guard, designed by state architect Isaac Perry.  Since the earliest years of professional and collegiate basketball, several college and minor league basketball teams have played in the Armory, as there was no other suitable facility for basketball in the Albany area for many years. The Armory also hosts boxing matches. For many years in the 1960s and 1970s the armory hosted the WWF (currently known as the WWE) wrestling association owned by the McMahon family. The Friday night cards were always a sellout.

In 1956, the Armory hosted two regular season NBA games. The first was the Fort Wayne Pistons versus the Syracuse Nationals on December 4th and the Minneapolis Lakers versus the Rochester Royals on December 20th. Neither game failed to bring many fans, with the Lakers and Royals game only selling 1,500 seats.

Between 1982 and 1990, the Armory was home to the Albany Patroons of the Continental Basketball Association. After the Patroons moved to the then-new Knickerbocker Arena, the Armory fell into disuse and was the target of several reuse proposals including becoming the new home of the Albany Library System (whose main branch is next door to the Armory). The Armory was listed on the National Register of Historic Places on March 2, 1995.

In 2004, Albany Basketball & Sports Corporation bought the Armory and the renovated facility opened in September 2005, later that year becoming the home for a reincarnated Patroons. In 2006, the CBA Patroons were joined by the former Pennsylvania ValleyDawgs of the USBL though their first home game as the USBL Patroons did not take place until 2007. It also became home to the New York Buzz of World TeamTennis prior to their 2008 season.

On December 15, 2007, the Armory had to cancel a concert of the rock band Brand New because the roof began to cave in.

Facilities and management

The Armory has  of floor space, meeting facilities, and two video screens. Its website states that it will soon open an underground mall featuring stores and eateries.

Michael Corts is the Armory's general manager. Former Albany County Executive James Coyne served as general manager from 2005 to 2009. Jay Baron replaced Jim Coyne.

See also
 Lark Street
 National Register of Historic Places listings in Albany, New York

References

External links

Washington Avenue Armory Homepage

Indoor arenas in New York (state)
Basketball venues in New York (state)
Boxing venues in New York (state)
Sports venues in Albany, New York
Armories on the National Register of Historic Places in New York (state)
Romanesque Revival architecture in New York (state)
Infrastructure completed in 1890
National Register of Historic Places in Albany, New York
Event venues on the National Register of Historic Places in New York (state)
Continental Basketball Association venues
The Basketball League venues
Tennis venues in New York (state)
Defunct college basketball venues in the United States